Jacoby Watkins (born March 29, 1984 in Laurinburg, North Carolina) is a Defensive Coordinator/Assistant Head Coach at ASA-Miami College in Miami, Florida.  He played college football and participated in track & field at the University of North Carolina. He was  signed to play Defensive Back by the Miami Dolphins as an undrafted free agent in 2007.

External links
North Carolina Tar Heels bio

1984 births
Living people
People from Laurinburg, North Carolina
American football cornerbacks
North Carolina Tar Heels football players
Miami Dolphins players